Return to the Sheepfold (Italian - Ritorno all'ovile) is a  painting by Carlo Pittara, originally entitled The Return (Italian - La ritirata), now in the Galleria civica d'arte moderna e contemporanea in Turin.

Exhibition history 
 1866, Mostra della Società Promotrice delle Belle Arti, Torino
 1991, Il lavoro e l'uomo Il lavoro dell'uomo da Goya a Kandinskij, Braccio di Carlo Magno, Città del Vaticano<
 2019–2020, "La fiera di Saluzzo", mostra alla Galleria di Arte Moderna, Torino.

References

Bibliography 
 Andreina Griseri, Il paesaggio nella pittura piemontese dell'Ottocento, Milano, Fabbri, 1967, SBN IT\ICCU\SBL\0077415.
 Morello Giuseppe (a cura di), Il lavoro dell'uomo da Goya a Kandinskij, Milano, Fabbri Editori, 1991, SBN IT\ICCU\RAV\0179129
 Giuseppe Luigi Marini (a cura di), Carlo Pittara e la scuola di Rivara: un momento magico dell'Ottocento pedemontano, Torino, Adarte, 2016, SBN IT\ICCU\LO1\1646275.

Sheep in art
Paintings in Turin
1866 paintings